Cualquier Día ("Any Day") is Latin Grammy winning album and debut Spanish album of Puerto Rican singer-songwriter Kany García. It reached the top 10 of the Latin Pop album charts in the United States, top 50 in Mexico and #1 in Puerto Rico. The album was released on September 17, 2008 and produced by Sony BMG. It was released to critical acclaim.

Album information
When Kany was introduce and sang to Franco De Vita, she was later signed to SONY BMG. Later that year she started recording her debut album. Cualquier Día was recorded in both Mexico and Puerto Rico, with the help of music producer Memo Gil. All the songs in the album were written by García herself. The album was released in July 2007, and already was receiving great response by the critics. According to Kany, the album is "a disc with 11 different stories, inspired by everyday things, from love stories to disaffection."

The album produced five singles so far: "Hoy Ya Me Voy", "¿Qué Nos Pasó?", "Amigo en el Baño", "Esta Soledad", and "Estigma De Amor". All five songs have received heavy airplay in Kany's homeland Puerto Rico and in the states. The album was certified Disco de Oro by the RIAA for selling more than 100,000 in United States was also certified "Disco De Oro" by AMPROFON in Mexico for selling over 50,000 in that country alone.

On September 10, 2008, the album received four nominations for the 2008 Latin Grammy Awards. It was nominated for "Album of the Year" and "Best Female Pop Vocal Album", and the lead single Hoy Ya Me Voy, received a nomination for "Song of the Year" while Kany herself, is nominated for "Best New Artist". On November 11, 2008 Kany won the Latin Grammys for "Best New Artist" and " Best Female Pop Vocal Album".

Track listing
All tracks by Kany García

Critical reception

The review of the album by Billboard Magazine:

A review from El Nuevo Herald:

Singles

Hoy Ya Me Voy

"Hoy Ya Me Voy" was the first single from Cualquier Dia. It was released earlier to radio stations on May 1, 2007, and as a digital download on iTunes on May 7, 2007. The music video was shot in Mexico and was directed by Alexis Gudino."Hoy Ya Me Voy" became Garcia's second highest peaking single since reaching number 22 on the Billboard Top 50 Latin Songs. The song won a Billboard Latin Music Award for "Latin Pop Airplay Song of the Year, New Artist", and it was nominated for "Song of the Year" at this year's Latin Grammy Awards.

¿Qué Nos Pasó?

"¿Qué Nos Pasó?" was released for radio airplay in the US, and was the second single from the album. It reached at number 22 on the Billboard Latin Pop Airplay chart.

Amigo en el Baño

"Amigo en el Baño" was officially released for radio airplay in the U.S. in February 2008. The music video for the song premiered in March on Puerto Rico's late night TV Show, No Te Duermas. It reached the Top 50 on Billboard Top Latin Songs, becoming Garcia's second song to chart.

Esta Soledad

"Esta Soledad" became the fourth single of Cualquier Dia. The song became Garcia's highest peaking song in the United States, reaching at #21 on Billboard Hot Latin Songs and #6 on Billboard Latin Pop Airplay.

Estigma De Amor

"Estigma De Amor" is the fifth and final single from Cualquier Dia. The song was sent to radio on September 16, 2008. The song debuted on Billboard Latin Pop Airplay at #38, and is currently at #15 becoming Kany's third Top 20 Hit on that chart. It also charted on Billboard Hot Latin Songs at #43.

Cualquier Dia: Edicion Especial

The album Cualquier Dia was re-released with three songs performed acoustic with visual materials showing the making of and it also includes all the four music videos released so far. The album was released in United States and Puerto Rico only. The new edition of the album was released on October 21, 2008.

Track listing
Disk 1:
"Esta Soledad"
"Estigma de Amor"
"Amigo en el Baño"
"Hoy Ya Me Voy"
"Mujer de Tacones"
"¿Adónde fue Cecilia?"
"Te Vuelvo a Ver"
"¿Qué Nos Pasó?"
"Carla Se Fue"
"Si Ya No Estas Conmigo"
"Todo Basta"

Disk 2:
"Bienvenida" (Video)
"Todo Basta" (Acoustic Video)
"Hoy Ya Me Voy" (Acoustic Video)
"Te Vuelvo A Ver" (Acoustic Video)
"Que Nos Pasó?" (Music Video)
"Amigo en el Baño" (Music Video)
"Esta Soledad" (Music Video)
"Hoy Ya Me Voy (Music Video)

Release history

Awards

Chart performance
Cualquier Día debuted on Billboard Top Latin Albums at #72 and quickly rose to #48. The album charted well on Billboard Latin Pop Albums on where it charted at #10. The album was certified Disco De Oro (Gold Album) by the RIAA. In Latin America, the album debuted at #84 on Mexico Album Charts. Months after being on the charts, the album quickly jumped to #41. It was later certified Disco de Oro, for shipments of 50,000 in Mexico alone. It has spent over 35 weeks in the chart.

Charts

Sales and certifications

End of the year charts

Personnel

Production
Vocals – Kany García
Producer – Guillermo Gil
Co-producer - Pancho Ruiz & Mario Santos
Director of artist - Paul Forat & José Gazmey
A&R - Charlie García
Recorded - La Bodega, México. D.F.
Mixing (place) - El Cielo Recording Studio Monterrey, México
Mixing by - Memo Gil
Recording assistant (La Bodega) - Juan Barbosa
Mix assistant (El Cielo Recording) - Lalo
Mastering - Güicho Gil en El Cuarto de Máquinas México, D.F.
Composer/songwriter - Kany García
Editor - Warner Chappell

References

2007 debut albums
Kany García albums
Latin Grammy Award for Best Female Pop Vocal Album
Sony BMG Norte albums